Florian Tuma (born 14 July 1977 in Vienna)  is an Austrian former competitive figure skater. He is a five-time Austrian national champion (1993–1997) and competed in the final segment at six ISU Championships, including the 1995 World Championships in Birmingham, England, and 1996 European Championships in Sofia, Bulgaria.

Programs

Results

References

Navigation

Austrian male single skaters
Living people
1977 births
Figure skaters from Vienna